Retreat railway station is a Metrorail station in Retreat, a suburb of Cape Town. It is a stop on the Southern Line and serves as the terminus of the Cape Flats Line. The station is located next to a terminus of Golden Arrow Bus Services and a large minibus taxi rank, forming a major transport interchange for the South Peninsula region.

The station building is on the western side of the line, attached to Platform 1. Platforms 2 and 3 are on an island. The platforms are connected by two pedestrian bridges. In normal operation, Platform 1 is used for northbound trains (travelling towards Cape Town), and Platform 2 is used for southbound trains.

Notable places nearby
 Blue Route Mall
 Retreat Central Recreational Area

Railway stations in Cape Town
Metrorail Western Cape stations